Drevenik is a village in the municipality of Bitola, North Macedonia. It used to be part of the former municipality of Kukurečani.

Demographics
Drevenik is attested in the Ottoman defter of 1467/68 as a village in the vilayet of Manastir. The majority of the inhabitants  attested bore typical Albanian anthroponyms, such as Gjin, Gjon, Lazor, Dedë etc.

Drevenik has traditionally and exclusively been populated by Tosks, a subgroup of southern Albanians.

As of the 2021 census, Drevenik had 3 residents with the following ethnic composition:
Persons for whom data are taken from administrative sources 3

According to the 2002 census, the village had a total of 26 inhabitants. Ethnic groups in the village include:
 Albanians 26

References

External links

Villages in Bitola Municipality
Albanian communities in North Macedonia